Sir Heughan Bassett Rennie  (born 7 April 1945) is a New Zealand lawyer and businessman. In the 1989 Queen's Birthday Honours, he was appointed a Commander of the Order of the British Empire, in recognition of his service as chairman of the Broadcasting Corporation of New Zealand between 1984 and 1988. He was made a Queen's Counsel in 1995.

In the 2022 Queen's Birthday and Platinum Jubilee Honours, Rennie was appointed a Knight Companion of the New Zealand Order of Merit, for services to governance, the law, business and the community.

References

1945 births
Living people
New Zealand King's Counsel
New Zealand businesspeople
New Zealand Commanders of the Order of the British Empire
Knights Companion of the New Zealand Order of Merit
People from Whanganui